Melissa Cristina Márquez is a Puerto Rican marine biologist and science communicator. She studies Chondrichthyan fishes, including great white sharks.

Early life and education 
Márquez was inspired to study sharks when she first saw a Great white shark on the Discovery Channel program Shark Week, when she moved from Mexico to the United States. She completed her undergraduate degree at the New College of Florida in Sarasota, Florida, and a master’s degree from Victoria University of Wellington in New Zealand.

Research and career 
Márquez is currently pursuing a PhD in Australia.

Márquez is involved in multiple forms of public engagement. She launched The Fins United Initiative to provide "scientifically accurate and open-access (free) materials for educators worldwide", which includes bilingual resources for educators. She co-hosts ConCiencia Azul, a podcast which interviews Spanish-speaking researchers about ocean-related topics and unique challenges faced in Hispanic countries. In spring 2021, Márquez wrote a children's book series, titled Wild Survival!, based on her animal encounters. She is also a contributor to Forbes' science section.

In 2018, during a taping of Shark Week, Márquez was attacked by a crocodile while on a shark dive.

Márquez has previously been recognized as a member of InStyle's February 2021 Badass 50 list, and as a member of the annual Forbes 30 under 30 - Science list (2021). She has spoken about her research for various media outlets, including NPR, National Geographic and BBC. She will be named to Fuse Media's Future Hispanic History Class of 2021.

Selected academic publications 

 Science Communication in Multiple Languages Is Critical to Its Effectiveness. Melissa C. Márquez and Ana Maria Porras. Frontiers in Communication. 22 May 2020.
How ‘Blue’ Is ‘Green’ Energy? Andrew J.Wright, Claryana Araújo-Wang, John Y.Wang, Peter S.Ross, JakobTougaard, RobinWinkler, Melissa C.Márquez, Frances C.Robertson, Kayleigh Fawcett Williams, Randall R.Reeves. Trends in Ecology and Evolution. 2020.

References

External Links 

Living people
Puerto Rican women scientists
Year of birth missing (living people)
Science communicators
Marine biologists
New College of Florida alumni
Victoria University of Wellington alumni